The 2003 World Darts Trophy was the second edition of the World Darts Trophy, a professional darts tournament held at the De Vechtsebanen in Utrecht, the Netherlands, run by the British Darts Organisation and the World Darts Federation.

The 2002 winner, Tony David was beaten in the semi-finals by, the BDO World Champion and the eventual winner, Raymond van Barneveld in the men's event. Van Barneveld then beat Mervyn King in the final, 6–2 in sets. In the women's event, Mieke de Boer, the 2002 winner, was defeated in the semi-finals by Francis Hoenselaar. Hoenselaar was in turn beaten by, the BDO World Champion, Trina Gulliver, 3–1 in sets in the final.

Seeds

Men
  Raymond van Barneveld
  Mervyn King
  Ted Hankey
  Tony David
  Tony O'Shea
  Andy Fordham
  Martin Adams
  Brian Derbyshire

Prize money

Men

Men's tournament

Women's tournament

References 

World Darts Trophy
World Darts Trophy
2003 in Dutch sport